This is a list of television programs currently and formerly broadcast by the satellite television channel Mzansi Magic in South Africa.

Current programming

Soapies/Series

IsiThembiso 
eHostela (6 January,  2019 - present)
Gomora (30 March, 2020 - present)
Igazi
Ingoma
iNumber Number'IsikiziLockdownMadam And Mercy
Papa Penny Ahee
Real Housewives Of Johannesburg 
Saints and Sinners (3 August, 2014 - present)The HerdHousekeepersThe ImposterThe ThroneThe Queen (1 August, 2016 - present)
 The River (28 October, 2019 - present)
 Omen (5 January, 2020 - present)
  Trackers (5 April, 2020 - present)
  Grassroots (6 January, 2020 - present)
Isifiso
Real Housewives Of Capetown

Reality/DocumentaryCishe NgafaDate My FamilyLiving The Dream with SomiziNot a Diva Papa Penny AheePlease Step InThe Perfect MatchThe RanakasUtatakhouThando Nes'ThembuYimloYobeLifestyleChange DownOur Perfect WeddingMusicMassive MusicMzansi Magic Music Specials
The Lounge Series 

ComedyMzansi Comedy NightsSportsHomeGroundWWE Raw (highlights)
WWE SmackDown (highlights)

FoodCeleb Feast with ZolaLet's Eat with SiphokaziFranchisesClash of the Choirs South AfricaIdols South AfricaProject Runway South AfricaAcquiredBeing BonangThe DoctorsThe TalkDr. Phil 

Upcoming programmingRate My PlateFormer programming
Soapies/SeriesGreed & DesireRing of Lies
The Herd
Lockdown
The ThroneRockville(New Season (5) Returning) The RoadThe WildZabalazaYa LlaNkululeko

Reality/DocumentaryDiski DivasMusicIcilongoMy Top 10: My Life In MusicShay'NgomaComedyLaugh Out Loud – The Comedy ShowGame ShowsCula SiboneKa-ChingKabelo's BootcampKFC Taste KitchenNguwe Na?NewsDaily Sun TVAcquiredAyeye''

References

Mzansi Magic